Lothair of Italy may refer to:
Lothair I (d. 855), emperor and king
Lothair II of Italy (d. 950), king